WZSN is an adult contemporary radio station located in Greenwood, South Carolina. The station is licensed by the Federal Communications Commission (FCC) to broadcast on 103.5 FM with an ERP of 25 kW.  The station goes by the name Sunny 103.5 and carries ABC Radio's Hits & Favorites satellite format.

History
The station went on the air as WMTY-FM on March 9, 1989.  On January 20, 1991, the station changed its call sign to the current WZSN.

The station was founded by Wally Mullinax who was a popular DJ on country-music WESC-AM "660 in Dixie" in Greenville, SC from 1963 to 1975.

References

External links

ZSN
Radio stations established in 1989
Mainstream adult contemporary radio stations in the United States